State Line is an unincorporated community in North East Township in Erie County, Pennsylvania, United States, located just to the west of the New York state line.

Unincorporated communities in Erie County, Pennsylvania
Unincorporated communities in Pennsylvania